Khanpur is a medium size village in Phillaur tehsil of Jalandhar District of Punjab State, India. The village is administrated by Sarpanch who is elected representative of village. It is situated on Phillaur-Apra road and located 3.8 km away from Nagar, 3 km from census town Apra, 54 km from Jalandhar and 121 km from state capital Chandigarh. Khanpur has postal head office in Dayalpur which is 8 km away from the village.

Caste 
The village has schedule caste (SC) constitutes 78.27% of total population of the village and it doesn't have any Schedule Tribe (ST) population.

Education 
The village has a Punjabi Medium, Co-educational primary school (Govt. Primary School Khanpur) and other nearest government high school is located in Apra or Nagar.

Transport

Rail 
Phillaur Junction is the nearest train station which is situated 10.6 km away, however, Goraya Railway Station is 15 km away from the village.

Air 
The nearest domestic airport is located 41 km away in Ludhiana and the nearest international airport is located in Chandigarh also a second nearest international airport is 148 km away in Amritsar.

References 

Villages in Jalandhar district
Villages in Phillaur tehsil